The Charmer was a 1987 British television serial set in the 1930s, and starring Nigel Havers as Ralph Ernest Gorse, a seducing conman, Rosemary Leach as Joan Plumleigh-Bruce, a smitten victim widow and Bernard Hepton as Donald Stimpson, Plumleigh-Bruce's would-be beau, who vengefully pursues Gorse after he has conned her.

It was made by London Weekend Television (LWT) for ITV, and loosely based on the 1953 novel Mr. Stimpson and Mr. Gorse by Patrick Hamilton, the second work in the Gorse Trilogy.

The series was repeated in February and March 1990. ITV3 also repeated the series in full at 1:45 a.m. from 5 September 2009. Narrative repeats were on Mondays from 7 September 2009 at 10:05 a.m. It was broadcast in the US on Masterpiece Theater starting 30 April 1989.

Cast
Nigel Havers – Ralph Ernest Gorse
Rosemary Leach – Joan Plumleigh-Bruce
Bernard Hepton – Donald Stimpson
Fiona Fullerton – Clarice Mannors
George Baker – Harold Bennett
Judy Parfitt – Alison Warren
Abigail McKern – Pamela Bennett
Gillian Raine – Phyllis Bennett
Andrew Bicknell – Archie
Linal Haft – Henry
Patrick Godfrey – Mr. Norris

Reception
Writing for The Los Angeles Times, Ray Loynd wrote "The world loves a delicious scoundrel. "The Charmer," which begins a six-week run on "Masterpiece Theatre" Sunday (8 p.m. on Channels 50 and 24, 9 p.m. on Channels 28 and 15), is a suave romp of a diversion... Havers is so devilishly decadent you root for him not to get caught."

Episodes

References

External links

 

1987 British television series debuts
1987 British television series endings
1980s British drama television series
ITV television dramas
Television series by ITV Studios
London Weekend Television shows
1980s British television miniseries
Television series set in the 1930s
English-language television shows
Television shows set in the United Kingdom